Pierre Laurent Barthélemy François Charles de Saint-Cricq (24 August 1772 – 25 February 1854) was a French customs administrator and politician. He was a deputy from 1815–20 and 1824–33, Minister of Commerce & Manufacturing (1828–29) and a peer of France.

Early years

Pierre Laurent Barthélemy François Charles de Saint-Cricq was born in Orthez, Pyrénèes-Atlantiques, on 24 August 1772.
He was the son of Jean-Paul-Louis de Saint-Cricq, knight of the military order of St. Louis, Governor for the King of the castles of Minerve and Puisserguier  in Languedoc, and of dame Marie-Laurence-Josèphe-Raphaëlle-Pétronille de Mazanedo.
His family had belonged to the French aristocracy for several centuries.
His parents intended that he should become a priest, and sent him to school at the Barnabites monastery in Lescar, near Pau.
However, when the French Revolution (1789–1799) broke out, he moved to Paris where he attended the university.

Saint-Cricq married Jeanne-Clémence Lenain de Tillemont (10 May 1770 – 30 June 1828).
They had three sons and one daughter.
Their first son was born in 1796. The youngest child, Caroline, was born on 9 November 1810.
Saint-Cricq did not appear in public life until the advent of Napoleon.
He joined the Customs administration in the First French Empire, and quickly rose to the rank of division chief.

Bourbon Restoration

After the Bourbon Restoration Saint-Cricq was sponsored by Élie, duc Decazes.
He was appointed Commander of the Legion of Honour and Count on 10 April 1814.
Saint-Cricq was appointed Director General of Customs, taking office on 8 July 1815.
On 27 August 1815 he was named Councillor of State in ordinary service.
He was appointed to the Finance committee.
His appointment to the Customs service was confirmed by royal ordinance of 12 October 1815.

On 22 August 1815 Saint-Cricq was elected deputy for Seine-et-Marne.
He sat with the majority in the Chamber.
In 1816 he was again named Councillor of State on the Finance committee.
He was reelected on 4 October 1816 and 20 October 1818.
He took a centrist position, and often spoke on the budget, the press, recruitment, Customs, smuggling and elections.
Beside his fixed salary, between 1815 and 1817 Saint-Cricq received bonuses that amounted to 170,000 francs.

Saint-Cricq supported the emergency laws and the new electoral system.
In 1820 he defended the Ministry of Élie Decazes and supported restoration of censorship.
He was reelected on 13 November 1820 deputy for Basses-Pyrénées.
However, the Chamber annulled this election on 22 December 1820.
He was returned for Basses-Pyrénées on 6 March 1824 and on 17 November 1827.
On 4 January 1828 Saint-Cricq was appointed by King Charles X of France to the Ministry of Jean-Baptiste de Martignac, with the portfolio of Agriculture and Commerce.
He held this position until 9 August 1829 when the Martignac cabinet was replaced by the Ministry of Jules de Polignac.
He was reelected on 19 July 1830.

Later career

After the July Revolution Saint-Cricq adhered to the monarchy of Louis Philippe.
He was reelected on 5 July 1831 deputy for Basses-Pyrénées (Orthez).
On 27 June 1833 Saint-Cricq was promoted to Peer of France.
After the February Revolution of 1848 he returned to private life.
He died in Pau, Pyrénées-Atlantiques, on 25 February 1854 at the age of 81.

Notes

Sources

1772 births
1854 deaths
People from Orthez
Politicians from Nouvelle-Aquitaine
French Ministers of Commerce and Manufacturing
Members of the Chamber of Deputies of the Bourbon Restoration
Members of the 1st Chamber of Deputies of the July Monarchy
Members of the 2nd Chamber of Deputies of the July Monarchy
Members of the Chamber of Peers of the July Monarchy
Commandeurs of the Légion d'honneur
Grand Officiers of the Légion d'honneur